Boundary changes affecting the English county of Staffordshire:

1844: The Counties (Detached Parts) Act transferred two parishes from, and part of a township to, the county.
1888: Those parts of the town of Tamworth lying in Warwickshire, and those parts of Burton upon Trent lying in Derbyshire were ceded to Staffordshire. Lichfield ceased to be a county in its own right.
1891: Harborne became part of the county borough of Birmingham and thus transferred from Staffordshire to Warwickshire by the Local Govt. Bd.'s Prov. Orders Conf. (No. 13) Act, 54 & 55 Vic. c. 161 (local act).
1895: a small section containing the villages of Shatterford and Upper Arley was transferred to Worcestershire.
1911: Handsworth became part of Birmingham, then in Warwickshire.
1928: Perry Barr was ceded to Warwickshire, also as part of Birmingham.
1966: Smethwick and Rowley Regis became part of Worcestershire, as components of the newly formed borough of Warley. Dudley was ceded from Worcestershire, having absorbed the Staffordshire towns of Sedgley, Coseley and Brierley Hill into its local authority.
1974: Under The Local Government Act 1972, Dudley, Wolverhampton, Walsall and West Bromwich (plus Warley and Birmingham) became part of the newly formed West Midlands County.
1994: The western/southern shores of Chasewater, were acquired from the West Midlands, transferring from the Walsall local authority into Lichfield District Council.

See also

Lists of English county boundary changes
boundary changes
Boundary